Omar Pernet Hernández is a Cuban librarian, human rights activist, and a former political prisoner.

He was imprisoned during the Black Spring in 2003 and released to exile in Spain in 2008. Amnesty International considered him a prisoner of conscience.

References

External links
 Ex-Cuban prisoner of conscience Omar Pernet Hernandez describes torture (video in Spanish)

Amnesty International prisoners of conscience held by Cuba
Cuban dissidents
Cuban human rights activists
Living people
Year of birth missing (living people)
Cuban prisoners and detainees
Cuban exiles
Cuban emigrants to Spain